Brâncovenesc art or Brâncovenesc style (or ), also known as the Wallachian Renaissance or the Romanian Renaissance, is an artistic style that evolved during the administration of Prince Constantin Brâncoveanu in the late 17th and early 18th centuries. Brâncoveanu was the domn and voivode of the Principality of Wallachia (between 1688 and 1714), an extremely wealthy aristocrat, and a builder of fine palaces and churches. Brâncovenesc art was mostly focused on architecture, but also manifested through painting and sculpture.

Architecture

Description
The design style developed in Wallachia, in present day southern Romania. Brâncovenesc style is synthesis between the Byzantine, Ottoman, and late Renaissance. It was also a unique hybrid of Romanian Orthodox Christian edifice styles working with the dominant Islamic architecture of the Ottoman Empire, of which the Principality of Wallachia was a vassal.
The most accomplished and the best preserved example of Brâncovenesc style architecture is Horezu monastery, inscribed by UNESCO on its list of World Heritage Sites, where Brâncoveanu intended to have his tomb.

Revival

The Brâncovenesc style inspired architect Ion Mincu and other architects to create the Neo-Brâncovenesc/Neo-Romanian architectural style in the late 19th century. The style combines features from Art nouveau, Byzantine, Italian and ethnographic architecture. Ion Mincu and his successors, Grigore Cerchez, Cristofi Cerchez, Petre Antonescu, or Nicolae Ghica-Budești declared themselves for a modern architecture, with Romanian specific, based on theses such as those formulated by Alexandru Odobescu around 1870:

Notable examples
Arnota Monastery
Brâncoveanu Monastery 
Cozia Monastery
Govora Monastery
Horezu Monastery 
Potlogi Palace
Surpatele Monastery
Sinaia Monastery
Văcărești Monastery — demolished, frescos salvaged.
Examples in Bucharest include:
Cotroceni Palace
Kretzulescu Church
Mogoșoaia Palace 
St. George the New Church
Stavropoleos Monastery

Painting and sculpture
Although Brâncovenesc art is mostly focused on architecture, it also has remarkable pictorial works. An example is the iconostasis and wall painting of the St. Nicholas Church of Făgăraș. Brâncovenesc art was also manifested through sculpture, which had a marked Venetian influence.

See also
 Early Modern Romania
 Romanian art
 Romanian architecture
 Constantin Brâncoveanu

References

External links
 

 
Romanian art